Herbert Grant Adcox (January 2, 1950 – November 19, 1989) was an American stockcar driver who died in a single-car accident in the 1989 Atlanta Journal 500 in the NASCAR Winston Cup Series.

Career
Adcox's Winston Cup Series career started in 1974, running a handful of races for his father Herb Adcox with sponsorship backing from the family's Chevrolet dealership in Chattanooga, Tennessee.

In that year's Winston 500 – considered one of the top events in the sport – held at the fastest track on the circuit, the Talladega Superspeedway, Adcox and his father qualified for the event.  With a hundred laps in the books, a caution period came out as Donnie Allison's clutch burned out and David Sisco's motor blew up.  Gary Bettenhausen, who had pitted a lap after the leaders, was up on jacks as Adcox came down for service.  Adcox's car hit an oil and water patch and slammed straight into Bettenhausen's Matador, crushing catch-can man Don Miller between the cars.  A young crew member of the Nord Krauskopf team who was nearby, Buddy Parrott, came rushing down to help, while Penske crew members John Woodward and John Watson were also injured. Miller was taken to a hospital and eventually had his right leg amputated.  Learning of the extent of Miller's injuries, Adcox went into shock, and his car was withdrawn from the event.

Adcox continued to run sporadic Winston Cup races over the years. He qualified for the 1975 Talladega 500, but his crew chief Gene Lovell suffered a heart attack and died in their garage. Adcox's car was withdrawn, but he was able to find a substitute ride. However, the race was delayed for a week due to rain, and Adcox was again forced to withdraw. His spot on the grid was given to Tiny Lund, who had not raced in Winston Cup for several years. Lund subsequently died during the race in an accident on lap seven.

The 1978 Winston 500 at Talladega was Adcox's best result, as Krystal Restaurants came on board for a partial season with sponsorship money and in his family-owned Chevrolet, Adcox finished fifth in his career best Winston Cup finish.

Adcox's racing career was consistently underfunded. A year later, he was again sponsorless; he timed in fourth for the 1979 Firecracker 400 at Daytona International Speedway, but his car's raw speed did not pay off, and his motor expired early. He continued to run sporadic events over the years, but never again contended.

Adcox's primary claim to fame was for being a strong competitor in ARCA competition, a lesser stockcar series that uses older Winston Cup cars and more grassroots-based operations.  He was especially dominant on the superspeedways; he won a record four of them in 1986 and had eight total superspeedway triumphs in his career, with five victories coming at Talladega. Dale Earnhardt, in an interview before a 1989 race at North Carolina Motor Speedway, remarked about how well Adcox had done in ARCA and said that if he had the monetary backing that other teams had, he might become a success in NASCAR.

For 1989, Adcox had signed up with Bumper to Bumper All Pro Autoparts and in a family-owned Chevrolet planned to run in a handful of Cup events.

Death
In the season finale at Atlanta Motor Speedway, Adcox crashed heavily on lap 202 of the event and died of major chest and head injuries, also suffering a heart attack as result of the crash.  Upon investigation,  the severe impact was determined to have torn his improperly mounted racing seat away from its mount entirely, and this led to Adcox's death.  It also led to new safety regulations on the way seats were mounted for the 1990 season.

ARCA's sportsmanship award, the H.G. Adcox Award, is named in Adcox's honor, and was awarded annually by his father Herb until his death in 2015.  The Grant Adcox Memorial is also held annually in his honor at North Georgia Speedway and a subsequent event has been held also in Cleveland, Tennessee.

Adcox is interred at the Chattanooga Memorial Park in Chattanooga, TN.

Motorsports career results

NASCAR
(key) (Bold – Pole position awarded by qualifying time. Italics – Pole position earned by points standings or practice time. * – Most laps led.)

Winston Cup Series

Daytona 500

Busch Series

ARCA Permatex SuperCar Series
(key) (Bold – Pole position awarded by qualifying time. Italics – Pole position earned by points standings or practice time. * – Most laps led.)

References

External links 
Racer Profile: Grant Adcox (From Speedwaymedia.com)

1950 births
1989 deaths
Sportspeople from Chattanooga, Tennessee
Racing drivers from Tennessee
NASCAR drivers
ARCA Menards Series drivers
Racing drivers who died while racing
Sports deaths in Georgia (U.S. state)
Road incident deaths in Georgia (U.S. state)
Filmed deaths in motorsport